Il generale dorme in piedi (The general sleeps standing up) is a 1972 commedia all'italiana. It represents the directorial debut of Francesco Massaro and it is based on a novel with the same name written by Giuseppe D'Agata. It was filmed in Tunis, Rome and Florence.

Cast 
Ugo Tognazzi: Colonel Leone
Mariangela Melato: Lola
Franco Fabrizi: Captain Beltrani
Mario Scaccia: General Pigna
Stefano Satta Flores: Official
Checco Rissone: General Cicciolo
Daniele Vargas: Lt. Poli
Georges Wilson: General 
Eros Pagni  
Flavio Bucci

References

External links

1972 films
Italian comedy-drama films
1972 comedy-drama films
Commedia all'italiana
Films shot in Tunisia
Films directed by Francesco Massaro
Films with screenplays by Ugo Pirro
Films based on Italian novels
1972 directorial debut films
Films scored by Fiorenzo Carpi
1970s Italian films
1970s Italian-language films